Pieter Willem Steenkamp (born 11 December 1997) is a Namibian rugby union player for the n national team and for the  in the Currie Cup and the Rugby Challenge. His regular position is fly-half or fullback.

Rugby career

Steenkamp was born in Mariental.

References

External links
 

Namibian rugby union players
Living people
1997 births
People from Hardap Region
Rugby union fly-halves
Namibia international rugby union players
Welwitschias players